The 1954 Allan Cup was the Canadian senior ice hockey championship for the 1953–54 senior "A" season.  The event was hosted by the Penticton V's and Penticton, Vernon, and Kelowna, British Columbia.  The 1954 playoff marked the 46th time that the Allan Cup has been awarded.

Teams
Sudbury Wolves (Eastern Canadian Champions)
Penticton V's (Western Canadian Champions)

Playdowns

Allan Cup Best-of-Seven Series
Sudbury Wolves 2 - Penticton Vees 1
Penticton Vees 6 - Sudbury Wolves 2
Sudbury Wolves 3 - Penticton Vees 1
Sudbury Wolves 8 - Penticton Vees 2
Penticton Vees 6 - Sudbury Wolves 5 (OT)
Penticton Vees 6 - Sudbury Wolves 4
Penticton Vees 3 - Sudbury Wolves 2

Eastern Playdowns
Semi-final
Matane Red Rocks defeated Fredericton Capitals 4-games-to-none
Matane Red Rocks 4 - Fredericton Capitals 0
Matane Red Rocks 8 - Fredericton Capitals 3
Matane Red Rocks beat Fredericton Capitals
Matane Red Rocks 3 - Fredericton Capitals 2
Sudbury Wolves defeated Owen Sound Mercurys 4-games-to-3
Sudbury Wolves 4 - Owen Sound Mercurys 1
Sudbury Wolves 4 - Owen Sound Mercurys 0
Owen Sound Mercurys 5 - Sudbury Wolves 2
Owen Sound Mercurys 3 - Sudbury Wolves 1
Owen Sound Mercurys beat Sudbury Wolves
Sudbury Wolves 3 - Owen Sound Mercurys 1
Sudbury Wolves 4 - Owen Sound Mercurys 1
Final
Sudbury Wolves defeated Matane Red Rocks 4-games-to-2 with 1 tie
Sudbury Wolves 4 - Matane Red Rocks 4
Matane Red Rocks 3 - Sudbury Wolves 2
Sudbury Wolves 5 - Matane Red Rocks 3
Sudbury Wolves 4 - Matane Red Rocks 2
Sudbury Wolves 5 - Matane Red Rocks 3
Matane Red Rocks 5 - Sudbury Wolves 1
Sudbury Wolves 3 - Matane Red Rocks 0

Western Playdowns
Quarter-final
Winnipeg Maroons defeated Fort William Beavers 4-games-to-none
Winnipeg Maroons 2 - Fort William Beavers 1
Winnipeg Maroons 1 - Fort William Beavers 0
Winnipeg Maroons 3 - Fort William Beavers 1
Winnipeg Maroons 6 - Fort William Beavers 1
Semi-final
Winnipeg Maroons defeated Moose Jaw Millers 4-games-to-2 with 1 tie
Winnipeg Maroons 4 - Moose Jaw Millers 1
Moose Jaw Millers 3 - Winnipeg Maroons 2
Winnipeg Maroons 7 - Moose Jaw Millers 6
Winnipeg Maroons 3 - Moose Jaw Millers 3
Moose Jaw Millers 3 - Winnipeg Maroons 2
Winnipeg Maroons 8 - Moose Jaw Millers 2
Winnipeg Maroons 9 - Moose Jaw Millers 1
Final
Penticton Vees defeated Winnipeg Maroons 3-games-to-2 with 3 ties
Penticton Vees 4 - Winnipeg Maroons 4
Winnipeg Maroons 3 - Penticton Vees 2
Penticton Vees 7 - Winnipeg Maroons 1
Penticton Vees 4 - Winnipeg Maroons 4
Winnipeg Maroons 4 - Penticton Vees 0
Penticton Vees 4 - Winnipeg Maroons 4
Penticton Vees 5 - Winnipeg Maroons 1
Penticton Vees 5 - Winnipeg Maroons 2

References
Allan Cup archives

External links
Allan Cup website

1953–54 in Canadian ice hockey
Allan Cup